Manhunt is an American reality television series broadcast by Bravo. The series premiered on October 11, 2004, while its eighth and final episode aired on November 30, 2004. Filmed in Los Angeles, California, the series depicted a competition among fifteen men for a one-year contract with IMG Models. The contestants were required to travel around the United States and compete against one another in a variety of challenges. American model Carmen Electra hosted the series.

Guest judges former male supermodel Bruce Hulse, model Marisa Miller, former model now Photographer Director Kimberly Metz, STUFF Magazine editor Courtney Kendall. Jon Jonsson was the winner of this competition, receiving a $100,000 contract with IMG Models for four years.

Season summary

Models
(ages stated are at start of contest)

Semi-finalists

Finalists

John Stallings
John Stallings is an openly gay American model. He has appeared on The Janice Dickinson Modeling Agency, having been selected as a model by Janice Dickinson for her eponymous agency.

Paulo Rodriguez
Paulo Rodriguez was eliminated because the judges saw him more as an acting character than a high fashion model.

Kevin Peake
Actor and model. As 2003 Mr. USA, Kevin Peake represented the US in the International Male Modeling Competition which he placed 2nd runner up over all. At 18 yrs old, he was one of the finalists on ABC's Are You Hot?.

Matt Lanter
Now an actor and model. Later, he appeared in the American television series 90210 as Liam Court, originally a recurring character but now a lead role. Starred in the TV series Star Wars: The Clone Wars, along with its film of the same name.  Also starring in NBC's Timeless.

Photo shoot guide

 Episode 1 photo shoot: Topless in jeans; Group shot with Carmen Electra (casting)
 Episode 2 photo shoot: Late night rooftop with Marisa Miller
 Episode 3 photo shoot: Gender bender
 Episode 4 photo shoot: Advertising shoot with random products
 Episode 5 photo shoot: Secret paparazzi; B&W emotion in suit
 Episode 6 photo shoot: Swimsuit calendar; Runway on the pool
 Episode 7 photo shoot: Rainforest editorial
 Episode 8 photo shoot: B&W Nude

References

External links
 Official website of Manhunt (2004 TV series) (archive at the Wayback Machine)
 

2000s American reality television series
2004 American television series debuts
2004 American television series endings
Bravo (American TV network) original programming
English-language television shows
Modeling-themed reality television series